Luis Ricardo Rosas Pérez (born 3 April 1985) is a former Mexican football player who last played in Club León.

He joined the Pumas youth system at the age of 16 and worked his way through the ranks to make his first division in 2006, is considered a substitute player, but this season he would try to become a regular starter.
Currently he is pursuing his Masters in Advanced Studies in Sports Administration and Technology from the elite AISTS founded by the IOC, IMD Business School, EPFL and other prestigious Swiss academic institutions.
He is also the coach of the current football team(Men/Women) of AISTS

References
 
 
 

1985 births
Living people
Mexican footballers
Club Universidad Nacional footballers
Club León footballers
Association football midfielders